Khamekits were an ancient Ingush tribe living in North Caucasus during first century AD. They were mentioned by Strabo in his work Geographica. According to most researchers, Khamekits are ancestors of Ingushes that lived in vast area of mountainous Ingushetia, including the Dorkhe Valley with a center in Khamkhi.

Ethnonym and localization 
The first and only mention of the ethnonym is in work of Strabo, Geographica. He described the Khamekits as the inhabitants of very fertile lands. It's no coincidence that that the region of Khamkhin Shahar and in particular the fertile valley of Dorhe was always considered the breadbasket of mountainous Ingushetia. In this area, several mountain rivers flow into the Assa river and mountains surround a fertile valley on all sides. From the book of Strabo it is clear that the Khamekits coexist with troglodytes, polyphages and isadiacs. The name "Khamekits" is comparable with the name of the largest Ingush village Khamkhi in the upper reaches of the Assa river basin and its derivative names — the large Ingush teip Khamkhoy and Khamkhin shahar. A huge number of archaeological sites are localized in this area, including Cyclopean buildings of the 2nd millennium BC. The well-known Caucasian scholar, historian V.B. Vinogradov, wrote about the Khamekits:

See also 
 Gelians
 Gargareans
 Gelonians
 Legae

References

Bibliography 
 
 
 
 
 
 

History of the Caucasus
History of Ingushetia
Ingushetia